Thiksey is a village and the headquarters of its eponymous block in the Leh district of Ladakh, India. It is located in the Leh tehsil. The Thikse Monastery is located here.

Demographics 
According to the 2011 census of India, Thiksey has 433 households. The effective literacy rate (i.e. the literacy rate of population excluding children aged 6 and below) is 75.42%.

References

Villages in Leh tehsil